Sherwood is a city in Pulaski County, Arkansas, United States. As of the 2020 census, the population of the city was 32,731. It is part of the Little Rock−North Little Rock−Conway Metropolitan Statistical Area with 699,757 people according to the 2010 census.

History 
Sherwood was officially incorporated as a town on April 22, 1948. Sherwood moved to a city of Second Class on September 16, 1957 and subsequently as a city of First Class on April 30, 1971.

Geography
Sherwood is located at  (34.830890, -92.211514).

Climate
Sherwood lies in the humid subtropical climate zone (Köppen Cfa). Sherwood experiences all four seasons and does receive cold air masses from the north. Temperatures above  are somewhat common.

Demographics

2000 census 
As of the census of 2000, there were 21,511 people, 8,798 households, and 6,211 families residing in the city. The racial makeup of the city was 80.23% White, 17.83% Black or African American, 0.43% Native American, 0.95% Asian, 0.06% Pacific Islander, 0.83% from other races, and 1.24% from two or more races.  2.05% of the population were Hispanic or Latino of any race.

There were 8,798 households, out of which 32.6% had children under the age of 18 living with them, 57.4% were married couples living together, 10.4% had a female householder with no husband present, and 29.4% were non-families. 24.6% of all households were made up of individuals, and 6.4% had someone living alone who was 65 years of age or older.  The average household size was 2.42 and the average family size was 2.90.

In the city, the population was spread out, with 24.5% under the age of 18, 8.5% from 18 to 24, 32.0% from 25 to 44, 24.4% from 45 to 64, and 10.7% who were 65 years of age or older.  The median age was 36 years. For every 100 females, there were 94.5 males.  For every 100 females age 18 and over, there were 90.5 males.

The median income for a household in the city was $44,838, and the median income for a family was $51,510. Males had a median income of $34,133 versus $25,757 for females. The per capita income for the city was $21,515.  In Sherwood, 6.3% of the population and 5.4% of families were below the poverty line.  In addition, 9.7% of those under the age of 18 and 4.2% of those 65 and older were living below the poverty line.

2010 census 
As of the census of 2010, there were 29,523 people, 12,207 households, and 8,314 families residing in the city. The racial makeup of the city was 75.3% White, 18.5% Black or African American, 0.5% Native American, 1.6% Asian, 0.1% Pacific Islander, 1.6% from other races, and 2.4% from two or more races.  4.0% of the population were Hispanic or Latino of any race.

There were 12,207 households, out of which 30.5% had children under the age of 18 living with them, 50.6% were married couples living together, 13.9% had a female householder with no husband present, and 31.9% were non-families. 27.0% of all households were made up of individuals, and 21.9% had someone living alone who was 65 years of age or older.  The average household size was 2.41 and the average family size was 2.92.

2020 census

As of the 2020 United States census, there were 32,731 people, 12,337 households, and 8,324 families residing in the city.

Economy and business 

Large corporations with corporate headquarters in Sherwood include ABC Financial and Hank's Fine Furniture.

Major employers include customer contact centers for FTD.com and Cardinal Health.  Another major employer is CHI St Vincent's North Hospital.

Law and government 

The City of Sherwood is an incorporated municipality (city of the first class) with a Mayor elected to a four-year term, and eight elected aldermen, a city clerk, and a part-time city attorney.

Politics

Mayors 

The Sherwood Mayor serves four-year terms, with election held during the November midterm elections.  Mayor Mary Jo Heye-Townsell was sworn in on January 1, 2023. Virginia Hillman Young served from August 1, 2007-December 31, 2022. She was Sherwood's first female mayor. Bill Harmon served as interim mayor April 12, 2007 to July 31, 2007, following the resignation of Mayor Danny Stedman. Harmon had not run for re-election after holding the office of mayor for 14 years through 2006.

Stedman, who was elected in November 2006, previously served as a Sherwood alderman for four years. Upon taking office in January 2007, Stedman was extremely excited about his plans for Sherwood and the city's future. In April 2007, Stedman cited health concerns for himself and his wife as he resigned from office.

Stedman had been one of three newly elected officials in the city in the 2006 election.  Others include city clerk/treasurer Virginia R. Hillman, and council member Charlie Harmon (Alderman Ward 1, Position 2).

In 2007 a series of special elections were held. Five candidates ran for the office of Sherwood mayor after the resignation of former Mayor Danny Stedman.  No candidate received more than 50 percent of the votes, forcing a special election runoff between the two candidates receiving the most votes, which was held on July 31, 2007.

Results

City council

The City of Sherwood is represented on the city council by two aldermen position from four wards for a total of eight aldermen.  Aldermen currently serve four-year terms, staggered with alternating positions up for election every 2 years.

Aldermen

Other elected officials

Crime and enforcement 
Sherwood is supported by the Sherwood Police Department (SPD) since 1964. According to the city's website, the City of Sherwood has the  lowest crime rate in the Arkansas.

Fire and emergency services 
Sherwood is supported by the Sherwood Fire Department (SFD) since 1950. Additionally, the city has formed an Office of Emergency Management (OEM) to respond in cases of natural or man-made disasters.

CHI St Vincent's North Hospital is a non-profit 69 bed hospital with an emergency department that sees about 20,000 patients per year.  The hospital is classified as a Level IV Trauma Center by the State of Arkansas.  Services offered include Emergency Medicine, General Surgery, Orthopedic Surgery, and Internal Medicine including critical care.  Outpatient services include lab, radiology, as well as clinics for GI medicine and Neurology.

Gravel Ridge

The community of Gravel Ridge, located at  (34.870068, -92.187069), was a census-designated place (CDP) in Pulaski County that was annexed into the city of Sherwood in 2008.

Annexation
Gravel Ridge carried ties to both Jacksonville and Sherwood for many years.  Its telephone number prefix is shared with Sherwood, while Gravel Ridge shares a ZIP code with Jacksonville.  On February 5, 2008, a special election was held in Jacksonville for the annexation of Gravel Ridge into Jacksonville.  Upon the Jacksonville ballot issue being announced, Sherwood Mayor Hillman and the Sherwood city council ordered a special election for March 11, 2008, to gauge support for the annexation of Gravel Ridge into Sherwood.  In each of the cities' respective elections, each city's residents as well as the residents of Gravel Ridge voted.  The proposal for annexation into either Jacksonville or Sherwood passed in each election.  The result prompted a third special election for Gravel Ridge residents only on April 1, 2008, to vote on whether they wanted to be annexed into Sherwood or Jacksonville, with voters ultimately deciding in favor of annexation by Sherwood.

Gravel Ridge was formally annexed during the Sherwood city council meeting on April 28, 2008, during which the territory comprising the one-time census designated place was divided along Arkansas Highway 107 into additions to the first and second wards of Sherwood.

Voting results

Education 
Sherwood is home to several public and private schools for elementary and secondary education.  Students seeking higher education often attend nearby colleges and universities including the University of Arkansas at Little Rock and University of Central Arkansas.

Primary and secondary schools

Public schools 

The city's public schools are managed by the Pulaski County Special School District. The city's public high school is Sylvan Hills High School.  Other public schools include: Sylvan Hills Middle School, Cato Elementary School Bill Clinton Elementary Magnet School, Oakbrooke Elementary School, Sherwood Elementary School and Sylvan Hills Elementary School.

In 2008, LISA Academy North opened as a public charter school focused on STEM fields.

Private schools 
The Abundant Life School, now known as Abundant Life Christian Academy, is a co-educational private school for grades pre-kindergarten through twelfth grade and is a member of the Association of Christian Schools International (ACSI).

Other private schools include Victory Baptist Elementary School, Central Arkansas Christian Schools, and Immaculate Conception Catholic School.

Public libraries
The Central Arkansas Library System includes the Amy Sanders Library in Sherwood, which is a  facility that offers a variety of books, DVDs, public computers, and wireless Internet access.  The library, named in 1988 in honor of Amy Sanders, Sherwood's city clerk for more than 14 years, offers numerous children's programs.

Media 
The Sherwood Voice is a local weekly newspaper serving the city and its nearby communities in Pulaski County with its print publication and website. As a community newspaper, articles are centered around local news, issues, classified ads and events.  Sports coverage is usually limited to the area's middle school and high school teams, such as the Sylvan Hills Bears and the Abundant Life School Owls.

Sherwood is home to the several radio stations:
 KOKY (102.1 FM) that plays an urban adult contemporary playlist, and
 KMTL (760 AM) that produces a religious radio format, both serving the Little Rock metro area.

Infrastructure

Transportation 
The primary mode of local transportation in Sherwood is the automobile, though efforts have been made to increase the availability of alternative modes of transportation, including biking and walking paths, wide sidewalks, and buses.

Highways 
The following is a list of the freeways located in or near the Sherwood area:
 Within Sherwood
  Future Interstate 57
  U.S. Route 67
  U.S. Route 167
  Arkansas Highway 107
 Near Sherwood
  Interstate 440
  Interstate 30
  Interstate 40

Healthcare 
Sherwood is home to several hospitals including:
 St. Vincent Medical Center North—Facility that includes a Level IV trauma center, surgical suites and St. Vincent Heart Clinic Arkansas, and the Jack Stephens Heart Institute.
 St. Vincent Rehabilitation Hospital—Serves as a 60-bed acute rehabilitation hospital.

Parks 
In this list are the 14 parks currently located within Sherwood.

Henson Park
Pickthorne Park
Austin Lake Park
Storer Park
Sherwood Dog Park
Devon Park
Delmont Park
Fairway Park
Hughes Park
Lake Cherrywood Park
Indianhead Park
Verona Park
Thornhill Park
Stonehill Park
Sherwood Forest

Places of interest 
In addition to the city's 17 community parks and recreational facilities, the following places of interest exist:
 Roundtop Filling Station—Historic gasoline filling station; listed on the National Register of Historic Places.
 Bill Harmon Recreation Center
 The Greens at North Hills Municipal Golf Course; listed on the National Register of Historic Places
 Lake Cherrywood
 Indianhead Lake
Cheer Time Revolution (from the show Cheer Perfection)
Woody's Sherwood Forest

Notable people
Joey Lauren Adams, actress and director
Wes Bentley, film actor
Karilyn Brown, Republican member of the Arkansas House of Representatives since 2015; former justice of the peace; resident of Sherwood
John Burkhalter, businessman and Democratic politician, reared in Sherwood 
Kelly George, Miss Arkansas USA 2007
 Jeff Henderson, world-class long jump and sprinter
David Kerr, World Champion collegiate debater
Mark Lowery, member of the Arkansas House of Representatives from Pulaski County since 2013
Kevin McReynolds, former professional baseball player
Bryce Mitchell, undefeated UFC featherweight contender
Mathew Pitsch, Republican member of the Arkansas House of Representatives from Fort Smith since 2015; former resident of Sherwood 
Christina Marie Riggs, a woman who killed her children by injection and suffocation, later executed by lethal injection
Jennifer Sherrill, Miss Arkansas USA 2004
Terry Tiffee, professional baseball player
Ashur Tolliver, current professional baseball player
Harry Vines, former coach of Arkansas Rollin' Razorbacks; member National Wheelchair Basketball Association Hall of Fame

Notable events

North Hills Country Club controversy
The city was involved in a lawsuit over the development of North Hills Golf Course and Country Club, in the southern end of the city adjoining North Little Rock. A court date was scheduled in April 2008. Mayor Virginia Hillman repeatedly stated during her campaign for mayor for the special election that her plans were to put the issue to a vote for the citizens.  A petition was circulated to hold an election on the issue, but the Sherwood City Council voted to go ahead with the acquisition despite Mayor Hillman's objections.  The issue was last discussed at the Sherwood city council meeting at 7:00 P.M. on Monday, September 24, 2007. A re-zoning sign was placed on the North Hills property the week before Christmas of that year.

On July 21, 2008, the Sherwood City Council approved an ordinance authorizing the settlement of all litigated claims related to the property and structures commonly referred to as North Hill Country Club, which allowed the City of Sherwood to purchase of this property. Since the spring of 2010, the city operates the property as The Greens at North Hills Municipal Golf Course.

On July 28, 2010, the originally named Sylvan Hills Country Club Golf Course constructed in 1927 was listed on the National Register of Historic Places.

2009 Theft of City Funds 

In July 2009, after city officials were notified by Eagle Bank in December 2008, the Federal Bureau of Investigation began investigating the theft of $219,913  in municipal funds.  These funds were taken from the city's checking account through an unauthorized online electronic transfer.  This was the first time the city had experienced unauthorized accessing the city's checking account via the internet.  In response, city officials analyzed city's security system to its financial network and additional safeguards and protections were implemented.

Debtor's Prison  
Nikki Petree was released on August 25, 2016 after spending 35 days in county jail for bouncing a $28.93 check five years ago. Judge Milas Hale, who is accused of running a modern-day debtors' prison in Sherwood, Ark., sentenced the mother to jail; the Huffington Post reports Petree has been arrested seven times in connection with that charge and paid at least $640 to the city for the charge. She told the Post she still owes the city $1,300.

"Every time [I’d] go to jail, they’d let me out immediately for $100,” Petree said in an interview. “They’d turn around and add $600 or $700 more to my bond. I couldn't afford to pay. They cornered me, and there was no way out from underneath it. I felt overwhelmed and hopeless.

Petree said prior to her sentencing, Judge Hale asked Petree how much money she could pay today.  The judge and the city are facing a federal lawsuit over their alleged practice of unconstitutionally jailing defendants who are unable to pay court fines, fees, and costs.

References

External links

City of Sherwood official website
Sherwood Voice community newspaper

 
1948 establishments in Arkansas
Cities in Pulaski County, Arkansas
Cities in Arkansas
Cities in Little Rock–North Little Rock–Conway metropolitan area
Populated places established in 1948